The Parliamentary Under-Secretary of State for Technology, Innovation and Life Sciences is a junior position in the Department of Health and Social Care in the British government. It is currently vacant since 20 September 2022.

The role was formerly known as the Parliamentary Under-Secretary of State for Life Science, Parliamentary Under-Secretary of State for Quality and Parliamentary Under-Secretary of State for Care Quality.

This position has always been performed by a member of the House of Lords. As of 2022, the most recent incumbent was Lord Kamall, between 17 September 2021 and 20 September 2022.

Responsibility 
The Parliamentary Under Secretary of State for Technology, Innovation and Life Sciences leads on the following policy areas:

Life sciences
Medicines
Research
International diplomacy and relations
Data and technology
NHS security management, including cyber security
Sponsorship of Medicines and Healthcare products Regulatory Agency, National Institute for Health and Care Excellence, Health Research Authority, and NHS Business Services Authority

List of ministers

See also 
 List of government ministers of the United Kingdom
 Parliamentary Under-Secretary of State

References 

Department of Health and Social Care
COVID-19 pandemic in the United Kingdom and government structures
Lists of government ministers of the United Kingdom